Nocturne is an album by American saxophonist Oliver Nelson and vibraphonist Lem Winchester. It was originally released in 1961 by Prestige Records, as part of their  "Moodsville Series". As the title implies, Nocturne is a collection of mellow songs with relaxed, late-night feeling.

Track listing
"Nocturne" (Nelson) - 3:46
"Bob's Blues" (Nelson) - 5:30
"Man With a Horn" (Eddie DeLange, Jack Jenney, Bonnie Lake) - 6:08
"Early Morning" (Nelson) - 4:48
"In a Sentimental Mood" (Duke Ellington, Manny Kurtz, Irving Mills) - 6:15
"Azur'te" (Wild Bill Davis, Don Wolf) - 5:42
"Time After Time" (Sammy Cahn, Jule Styne) - 7:24

Personnel
Oliver Nelson - alto and tenor saxophone
Lem Winchester - vibes
Richard Wyands - piano
George Duvivier - bass
Roy Haynes - drums

References

Moodsville Records albums
Oliver Nelson albums
1961 albums
Albums recorded at Van Gelder Studio
Albums produced by Esmond Edwards